Lucasium microplax is a gecko endemic to Australia which is found in Western Australia, Northern Territory, and South Australia.

References

Lucasium
Reptiles described in 2020
Taxa named by Paul Doughty
Taxa named by Mark Norman Hutchinson
Taxa named by Mitzy Pepper
Geckos of Australia